Daniel Yankelovich (December 29, 1924 – September 22, 2017) was an American public opinion analyst and social scientist.

Education
After attending Boston Latin School, Yankelovich graduated from Harvard University in 1946 and 1950 before completing postgraduate studies at the Sorbonne in France. As a psychology professor he has taught at New York University and The New School for Social Research.  In 1996 he served as Senior Fellow at the John F. Kennedy School of Government at Harvard. In 2015, Yankelovich received the Warren J. Mitofsky Award for Excellence in Public Opinion Research from the board of directors of the Roper Center for Public Opinion Research at Cornell University.

Research firms
In 1958 he founded the marketing and research firm Daniel Yankelovich, Inc., which was later renamed as Yankelovich, Skelly, & White, Inc., remaining chair till 1986. In 2008, Yankelovich merged with Henley HeadlightVision to create The Futures Company, a planning consultancy that exists under the WPP communications holding company. He also founded The New York Times/Yankelovich Poll, now The New York Times/CBS Poll. In 1976, together with Cyrus Vance, he founded Public Agenda, a nonpartisan group devoted to public opinion and citizen education. In 1995 he was awarded the Helen Dinerman Award by the World Association for Public Opinion Research.

Landmark Education study
Yankelovich conducted an analysis of Landmark Education, Analysis of The Landmark Forum and Its Benefits, which consisted of a survey conducted of more than 1300 people who completed The Landmark Forum during a three-month period.  Some details of the study methodology, especially concerning sampling methods and demographics of study participants, remain undefined in Landmark Education's "full report" on it. It is unknown whether any part of Yankelovich's study was based on direct empirical research through participation in any of Landmark Education's related coursework.  Yankelovich concluded that 3 month after having participated 90% to 95% self-reported value in taking the course.

The New Framework Group
By 1982, Yankelovich had grown concerned that many of the postwar policies which had more or less succeeded between 1945-1980 were badly in need of rethinking.  With Congressman Les Aspin, Yankelovich chaired The New Framework Group, which brought together prominent men and women in a variety of fields, to discuss fruitful areas of reform.  They created four subgroups: in economic policy, foreign affairs, social policy, and the role of government.

Publications
His books include 
Coming to Public Judgment:Making Democracy Work in a Complex World, 
The Magic of Dialogue:Transforming Conflict into Cooperation, 
Profit With Honor: The New Stage of Market Capitalism, and 
Uniting America: Restoring the Vital Center to American Democracy (editor, with Norton Garfinkle, Yale University Press, 2006).

Trusteeships and Advisory Boards
He has served as a trustee at the Carnegie Foundation for the Advancement of Education, the Kettering Foundation, Brown University, and the UC San Diego Foundation.

Yankelovich was Chair of the Advisory Board of the Future of American Democracy Foundation, a nonprofit, nonpartisan foundation in partnership with Yale University Press and the Yale Center for International and Area Studies, "dedicated to research and education aimed at renewing and sustaining the historic vision of American democracy." He was elected to the Common Cause National Governing Board in 1976.

Yankelovich Center
In 2012, he founded the Yankelovich Center for Social Science Research at the University of California, San Diego, devoted to using social science to find practical solutions to the nation's most pressing problems. The center's projects include a commission to recommend evidence-based strategies for increasing upward mobility.

See also
 International Leadership Forum
 Landmark Education
 Raymond Fowler
 Arthur H. White

References

External links

Daniel Yankelovich Papers at the University of Connecticut library
Public Agenda
International Leadership Forum

Yankelovich Center for Social Science Research

1924 births
2017 deaths
Survey methodologists
American social scientists
New York University faculty
Harvard Kennedy School alumni
University of Paris alumni
The New School faculty
Scientists from Boston